Elisabeth Ulla Johanna Åkesdotter Ahlgren (later Borglin, 27 May 1925 – 27 April 2010) was a Swedish swimmer who won a bronze medal in the 4×100 m freestyle relay at the 1950 European Aquatics Championships. Her team was disqualified in the same event at the 1948 Summer Olympics; at those games she also competed individually and finished seventh in the 100 m freestyle.

References 

1925 births
2010 deaths
Swimmers at the 1948 Summer Olympics
Swedish female freestyle swimmers
Olympic swimmers of Sweden
European Aquatics Championships medalists in swimming
Sportspeople from Linköping